Richard Alan Burridge (born 11 June 1955) is a Church of England priest, biblical scholar and a former Dean of King's College London.

Early life and education
Burridge was born on 11 June 1955 to Alan Burridge and Iris Joyce Burridge (née Coates). Burridge played guitar in the band Exousia in the 1970s, and continues to record as a solo artist. He was educated at University College, Oxford where he received an MA and the University of Nottingham where he read for a PhD. His doctoral thesis on the genre of the gospels was published in 1992 as What are the Gospels? A Comparison with Graeco-Roman Biography. It played a  part in establishing that the Gospels were read as biographies in the first centuries after Christ, and that they belonged to a recognised literary genre of biographies rather than being unprecedented writings which reflected the faith and life of the post-Easter church.

Career

Early career
Burridge's early career was as a school teacher. From 1978 to 1982, he was a schoolmaster teaching classics and a house tutor at Sevenoaks School, a private school in Sevenoaks, Kent.

Ordained ministry
Burridge trained for the Anglican priesthood at St John's College, Nottingham. He was ordained deacon in 1985 and priest in 1986 and was curate at St Peter and St Paul, Bromley, Kent (1985–1987).

Academic career
Burridge was Dean of King's College London 1994–2019, and he was elected as a Fellow of King's College (FKC) in 2002. From 2007 to 2012, he was Director of New Testament Studies, and in 2008 he was appointed to a Personal Chair in Biblical Interpretation. He was a member of the Church of England's General Synod, and chaired their validation panel for ordination training and theological education (1996–2004); he is currently serving as a representative of the Church Commissioners and as deputy chair on the Church of England's Ethical Investment Advisory Group. He was a trustee of Cumberland Lodge between 1998 and 2008.

Role at King's College London

The Dean of King's College London is an ordained person responsible for overseeing the spiritual development and welfare of all students and staff as well as fostering vocations among the worshipping community.

When King's was founded in 1829 it was with the express purpose of ensuring that its students received an education that took seriously the religious dimension to life. Throughout the history of King's its deans have been key people in ensuring this continues. The college motto, sancte et sapienter ("with holiness and with wisdom"), reflects both the college's Anglican foundation and its continuing commitment to religious life and theological education.

The modern-day King's includes members from a wide array of backgrounds, cultures and faiths. Today the dean is responsible for the university's provision for its diverse religious community.
Richard Burridge retired as Dean of King's College London in 2019.

Personal life
In 1979, Burridge married Susan Morgan; they divorced in 2009. Together they had two daughters. In 2014, he married Megan Warner.

Selected publications

Books
  - revision of his doctoral thesis.

Articles and chapters

References

External links
 King's College London Staff Profile
 King's College London Dean's page
 "The King's Values: Consumer Culture and Higher Education" Dean's first inaugural lecture pdf transcript ("cogito ergo sum" being replaced by "tesco ergo sum")
  "(Re-) tell me the old, old Story: Narrative, Genre and the Bible" second Professorship inaugural lecture podcast (moralism of "the Bible says" as genre-mistake, scripture's library of diverse texts properly seen as "The Books" rich in diversity)

Living people
1955 births
Alumni of University College, Oxford
Deans of King's College London
Academics of King's College London
21st-century English theologians
British biblical scholars
20th-century English Anglican priests
Alumni of St John's College, Nottingham
Anglican biblical scholars
21st-century Christian biblical scholars
Fellows of King's College London
Ratzinger Prize laureates